Interstate 494 is a beltway around portions of Minneapolis-Saint Paul, Minnesota.

Interstate 494 may also refer to:
Crosstown Expressway (Chicago),  proposed highway route in Chicago, Illinois in the 1960s through the 1970s
Lake Shore Drive, proposed as "Interstate 494" in Chicago, Illinois in the 1950s through the 1960s

Cancelled highway projects in the United States
94-4
Interstate 494